Triệu is a Vietnamese surname, it is the equivalent of the Mandarin Chinese surname Zhao (趙). Trieu is the anglicized variation of the surname Triệu.

Notable people with the surname Triệu
Triệu Thị Trinh or Lady Triệu: a female Vietnamese warrior (225 to 248 CE) also known as the Vietnamese Joan of Arc.  
The Triệu/Zhao royals of Triệu dynasty/Nanyue
Triệu Việt Vương (Triệu Quang Phục), independence leader in the 6th century
 Andy Trieu, (1984–), Australian host, actor and martial artist. He is a three-time Australian Champion Martial Artist.
 Triệu Việt Hưng (1997–), Vietnamese footballer

See also
Treu, surname

Vietnamese-language surnames

vi:Triệu (họ)